Paramartyria maculatella is a species of moth belonging to the family Micropterigidae. It was described by Syuti Issiki in 1931. It is endemic to Taiwan.

References

Micropterigidae
Moths of Taiwan
Endemic fauna of Taiwan
Moths described in 1931